Darryl Allan Ashmore (born November 1, 1969) is a former American football offensive lineman in the National Football League for the Los Angeles/St. Louis Rams, Oakland Raiders and Washington Redskins. He played college football at Northwestern University. He replaced NFL Hall Of Famer Jackie Slater with the St. Louis Rams at right tackle. At Northwestern, after one year of playing offensive line, he garnered All-Big Ten Honors and made the Dean's List academically.

Darryl went on to have an 11-year career in the NFL despite suffering a career-threatening injury during his junior season at Northwestern, where he was a top defensive end in the Big Ten that season and prior. At Peoria High School he was rated one of the top players in the state  of Illinois as a senior. He was also named an All-American and received the Scholar Athlete of the Year in the Peoria  tri-county area.

References

1969 births
Living people
St. Louis Rams players
Oakland Raiders players
Washington Redskins players
Northwestern Wildcats football players
American football offensive linemen
Sportspeople from Peoria, Illinois
Players of American football from Illinois